The Tsou Ma Lai Farm is a recreational farm in Danei District, Tainan, Taiwan.

History
The area of the farm used to be the home for the Siraya people.

Geology
The farm is surrounded by the Zengwun River within the Alishan Range and spreads over an area of 120 hectares. It is divided into three main areas, which are the main recreational area, orchard recreational area and the pasture recreational area. The farm consists of more than 150 species of animal.

Events
The farm holds the annual Tainan International Mango Festival.

See also
 List of tourist attractions in Taiwan

References

External links
  

Buildings and structures in Tainan
Farms in Taiwan
Tourist attractions in Tainan